The Port Klang Komuter station is a train station in Port Klang, Selangor, Malaysia, operated by KTM Komuter. It is the western terminus, and name sake, of the Port Klang Line. 

The South Port cruise ship terminal, Port Klang Immigration Centre and the Pulau Ketam ferry terminal are located a walking distance from this station.

Many primary and secondary schools are located in the proximity, and because of that, this station can get packed during the mornings and evenings.

External links
Port Klang KTM Komuter Station

Klang District
Railway stations in Selangor
Port Klang Line